The 1941 Cal Poly Mustangs football team represented California Polytechnic School—now known as California Polytechnic State University, San Luis Obispo—as an independent during the 1941 college football season. Led by ninth-year head coach Howie O'Daniels, Cal Poly compiled a record of 5–3–1. The team outscored its opponents 84 to 72 for the season. The Mustangs played home games at Mustang Stadium in San Luis Obispo, California.

Schedule

Notes

References

Cal Poly
Cal Poly Mustangs football seasons
Cal Poly Mustangs football